The 1965 Pan Arab Games football tournament was the 4th edition of the Pan Arab Games men's football tournament. The football tournament was held in Cairo, Egypt between 2–11 September 1965 as part of the 1965 Pan Arab Games.

Participating teams
The following countries have participated for the final tournament:

 
  Lahej
 
 
  Muscat and Oman 
 
  Aden

Squads

Group stage

Group A

The match was abandoned at kick off because security fears due to overcrowding at the stadium caused the referee to call the match off. The match was replayed on 8 September 1965Group B

Knockout stage

Semifinals

Third place match

Final

Final ranking

References

External links
4th Pan Arab Games, 1965 (Cairo, Egypt) - rsssf.com''

1965 Pan Arab Games
1965
Pan
Pan
1965